Against the Wind is a soundtrack album for the Australian television miniseries Against the Wind (1978). The album was credited to Jon English and Mario Millo and released in Australia and New Zealand in 1978 and in Scandinavia in 1981.

The album was certified 2xGold in Australia.

Track listing

Charts

References

1978 soundtrack albums
Jon English albums
Country music soundtracks
Pop soundtracks
Polydor Records soundtracks
Television soundtracks